Barry Cuddihy (born 19 December 1996) is a Scottish footballer who plays as a midfielder for Clyde. Cuddihy has previously played for St Mirren and Annan Athletic.

Career
Born in Glasgow, Cuddihy began his career at St Mirren. He was an unused substitute in three of their 2013–14 Scottish Premiership matches, starting with a 1–1 home draw with Heart of Midlothian on 29 December 2013. He made his debut on 25 April 2015, playing three minutes as a substitute for Thomas Reilly at the end of a 4–1 win over Kilmarnock, and made two more substitute appearances as the season ended with relegation.

On 12 March 2016, Cuddihy moved to Annan Athletic of Scottish League Two on an emergency loan. He made his debut later that day, playing the entirety of a 4–2 loss at East Fife.  He was released by St Mirren at the end of the 2015–16 season.

After leaving St Mirren, Cuddihy returned to Annan Athletic on a one-year deal. He was subsequently signed for Clyde in July 2017 by former Annan manager Jim Chapman.

Career statistics

References

External links

Living people
1996 births
Footballers from Glasgow
Scottish footballers
Association football midfielders
St Mirren F.C. players
Annan Athletic F.C. players
Clyde F.C. players
Scottish Professional Football League players